Anne Poleska (born February 20, 1980) is a German breaststroke swimmer who has competed in international events and won a bronze medal at the Athens 2004 Summer Olympics.

Poleksa also competed in the 2000 and 2008 Olympic Games, swam for the University of Alabama through 2006,  and placed 2nd at the 2005 World Championships in Montreal, Canada.

References
 

Living people
1984 births
Female breaststroke swimmers
German female swimmers
Alabama Crimson Tide women's swimmers
Swimmers at the 2000 Summer Olympics
Swimmers at the 2004 Summer Olympics
Swimmers at the 2008 Summer Olympics
Olympic swimmers of Germany
Olympic bronze medalists for Germany
Olympic bronze medalists in swimming
World Aquatics Championships medalists in swimming
European Aquatics Championships medalists in swimming
Medalists at the 2004 Summer Olympics
Universiade medalists in swimming
Universiade silver medalists for Germany
Medalists at the 2001 Summer Universiade
Sportspeople from Krefeld
21st-century German women
20th-century German women